Robinsonade is a literary genre of fiction wherein the protagonist is suddenly separated from civilization, usually by being shipwrecked or marooned on a secluded and uninhabited island, and must improvise the means of their survival from the limited resources at hand. The genre takes its name from the 1719 novel Robinson Crusoe by Daniel Defoe. The success of this novel spawned so many imitations that its name was used to define a genre, which is sometimes described simply as a "desert island story" or a "castaway narrative". 

The word "robinsonade" was coined by the German writer Johann Gottfried Schnabel in the Preface of his 1731 work Die Insel Felsenburg (The Island Stronghold). It is often viewed as a subgenre of survivalist fiction. Already in Simplicius Simplicissimus (1668) by Hans Jakob Christoffel von Grimmelshausen the shipwrecked protagonist lives alone on an island.

Themes
In the view of Irish novelist James Joyce, Robinson Crusoe is a symbol of the British Empire: "He is the true prototype of the British colonist…" Later works would, arguably, expand on a mythology of colonialism.

Some of the common themes include:
 Isolation (e.g. desert island, virgin planet)
 A new beginning for some of the characters
 Self reflection
 Encounters with natives or apparent natives
 Commentary on society

See also themes for subgenres below.

Utopianism
Unlike Thomas More's Utopia and romantic works which depicted nature as idyllic, Crusoe made it unforgiving and sparse. The protagonist survives by his wits and the qualities of his cultural upbringing, which also enable him to prevail in conflicts with fellow castaways or over local peoples he may encounter.  However, he manages to wrest survival and even a certain amount of civilisation from the wilderness.  Works that followed went both in the more utopian direction (Swiss Family Robinson) and the dystopian direction (Lord of the Flies).

Inverted Crusoeism 
The term inverted Crusoeism was coined by J. G. Ballard. The paradigm of Robinson Crusoe has been a recurring topic in Ballard’s work. Whereas the original Robinson Crusoe became a castaway against his own will, Ballard's protagonists often choose to maroon themselves; hence inverted Crusoeism (e.g., Concrete Island). The concept provides a reason as to why people would deliberately maroon themselves on a remote island; in Ballard’s work, becoming a castaway is as much a healing and empowering process as an entrapping one, enabling people to discover a more meaningful and vital existence.

Examples
One of the best known robinsonades is The Swiss Family Robinson (1812–27) by Johann David Wyss, in which a shipwrecked clergyman, his wife, and his four sons manage not only to survive on their island but also to discover the good life. Jules Verne strands his castaways in Mysterious Island (1874) with only one match, one grain of wheat, a metal dog collar, and two watches.

Robinsonade proper
The robinsonade proper also contains the following themes:
 Progress through technology
 A storyline following the triumphs and the rebuilding of civilisation
 Economic achievement
 Unfriendliness of nature

Science fiction robinsonade

Genre SF robinsonades naturally tend to be set on uninhabited planets or satellites rather than islands. The Moon is the location of Ralph Morris's proto-SF The Life and Wonderful Adventures of John Daniel (1751), and of John W Campbell Jr's paean to human inventiveness, The Moon is Hell (1950). A classic example of an SF robinsonade which has all the elements of the robinsonade proper is Tom Godwin's The Survivors, as well as J. G. Ballard's Concrete Island. A more recent example is Andy Weir's 2011 The Martian. Joanna Russ' We Who Are About To... (1977) is a radical feminist objection to the entire genre.

Sears List of Subject Headings recommends that librarians also catalog apocalyptic fiction —such as Cormac McCarthy's popular novel The Road, or even Robert A. Heinlein's Starship Troopers—as robinsonades.

Film

Mr. Robinson Crusoe is the 1932 updating of the story where Douglas Fairbanks Sr. maroons himself on an uninhabited island for a year to win a bet.

Robinson Crusoe (1954 film) is the 1954 adventure film directed by Luis Buñuel, with Dan O'Herlihy in the title role. 

Robinson Crusoe on Mars is the 1964 story of the survivor of a space ship crash on the planet Mars.

Lt. Robin Crusoe, U.S.N. is the 1966 comedic retelling, featuring a US Navy pilot and a chimpanzee astronaut named Floyd.

Robinson Crusoe (1972) is the 1972 Russian film (Odessa film Studio) with Leonid Kuravlyov in the title role, and music by Antonio Vivaldi.

Enemy Mine is the SF story of a human and enemy alien who crash land on a barren planetoid and eventually cooperate to survive.

Cast Away is the 2000 film about a FedEx employee (Tom Hanks) who is the sole survivor of a plane crash and is stranded on a deserted island for four years.

The Martian is the 2015 film about a human astronaut stranded on Mars after a storm forces the rest of the crew to depart and the effort to recover him.

Comics
In 1940 Mort Weisinger created Green Arrow, a millionaire castaway turned to vigilante.

Years later, Gold Key Comics, produced a comic series, titled Space Family Robinson, in the early 1960s and later producer Irwin Allen, created his own version of a similar concept, about another Space Family Robinson, known as Lost in Space, for CBS.

The first appearance of a space-faring Robinson family (unrelated to the series' Robinsons) in comic books was Gold Key Comics's  The Space Family Robinson, December 1962. Space Family Robinson was published as a total of 59 issues, from 1962 to 1982. The first issue was published in December 1962. With issue #15 (January, 1966), the "Lost in Space" title was added to the cover.

The book Silver Age: The Second Generation of Comic Artists by Daniel Herman explains that when the Lost in Space TV series came out in 1965, it was obvious that it was inspired, at least in part, by the comic book, but CBS, the network airing the show, had never acquired the license from Western Publishing. Rather than sue CBS or Irwin Allen, Western decided to reach a settlement which allowed them to use "Lost in Space" for the title of the comic book. Since CBS and Irwin Allen licensed shows to Western, Western didn't want to antagonize them. Also, the TV show title probably helped sales of the comic book.

Television
The Adventures of Robinson Crusoe (TV series) is a 1964 French-German TV series with Robert Hoffmann in the title role. It was aired in 1965 in the UK with a soundtrack by Robert Mellin.

The 1965 Lost in Space TV series is an adaptation of the novel The Swiss Family Robinson. The astronaut family of Dr. John Robinson, accompanied by an Air Force pilot and a robot, set out from an overpopulated Earth in the spaceship Jupiter 2 to visit a planet circling the star Alpha Centauri with hopes of colonizing it. Their mission in 1997 (the official launch date of the Jupiter 2 was October 16, 1997) is immediately sabotaged by Dr. Zachary Smith, who slips aboard their spaceship and reprograms the robot to destroy the ship and crew.

Smith is trapped aboard, and saves himself by prematurely reviving the crew from suspended animation. They save the ship, but consequent damage leaves them lost in space. Eventually they crash on an alien world, later identified as Priplanis, where they must survive a host of adventures. Smith (whom the show's writer originally intended to kill off) remains through the series as a source of comedic cowardice and villainy, exploiting the forgiving (or forgetful) nature of the Robinsons.

Video games 
Several videogames have explored this theme, placing players in hostile environments where they must work towards a specific goal or merely survive. As such, robinsonade video games can be included in the broader survival game genre. A few examples of this genre are the games in the Stranded series, Stranded Deep, The Forest and more recently Minecraft.

See also
Accidental travel
Edisonade
Homage (arts)
Nautical fiction

References

External links
For historical examples, see "Daniel Defoe's Robinson Crusoe & the Robinsonades Digital Collection" which has an overview of the genre along with over 200 versions of Robinson Crusoe and historical robinsonades openly and freely online with full text and zoomable page images from the Baldwin Library of Historical Children's Literature
 For literary criticism on the subject, see "Chapter 7: Unmapping Adventures: Robinsons and Robinsonades" in Mapping Men and Empire: A Geography of Adventure, by Richard Phillips, published in 1997, and Empire Islands: Castaways, Cannibals, and Fantasies of Conquest, by Rebecca Weaver-Hightower, University of Minnesota P, 2007, .

Literary genres
Survivalism
Robinson Crusoe
Adventure fiction
Castaways in fiction